"American Girls" is a single by American rock band Counting Crows. It is the second track on their fourth studio album, Hard Candy (2002), and features Sheryl Crow on backing vocals. The song was released on May 13, 2002.

Charts

Release history

References

2002 singles
2002 songs
Counting Crows songs
Geffen Records singles
Music videos directed by Marc Webb
Song recordings produced by Steve Lillywhite
Songs written by Adam Duritz
Songs written by Charlie Gillingham
Songs written by Dan Vickrey
Songs written by David Bryson
Songs written by David Immerglück